Karapet Karapetyan (born 28 November 1982), also known as Karapet Papijan is an Armenian-Dutch kickboxer who competes in the super middleweight and light heavyweight divisions. A professional since 2002, Karapetyan established himself on the Dutch scene by becoming a national champion and having a short stint in the It's Showtime promotion before two ill-fated world title shots in 2012. He signed with Glory the following year. As of 2 November 2015, he is ranked the #3 welterweight in the world by GLORY.

Early life
Born in Armenia, Karapet Karapetyan moved to the Netherlands aged sixteen in 1998 in the aftermath of the First Nagorno-Karabakh War, initially living in Rotterdam before settling in Nijmegen with his parents and two sisters. He had limited martial arts training in his homeland but began training in kickboxing and Muay Thai seriously under the tutelage of Perry Ubeda after his arrival in Nijmegen, having his first fight after six months of preparation.

Career

Early career (2002–2012)
Having turned professional in 2002, Karapetyan spent a number of years honing his skills on the Dutch kickboxing and Muay Thai scene in a rather unremarkable beginning to his career. On June 4, 2006, he competed in the World Full Contact Association (WFCA) 2006 Super Middleweight (-76.2 kg/168 lb) Tournament in Druten, Netherlands, outpointing Mustafa Yılmaz in the quarter-finals and Winston Martens in the semis before losing to Joost Bauhaus, who he was already 0-1-1 against in two previous fights, in the final. The tournament final between the pair was scored a draw after the regulation three round and so it went to an extension round to decide the winner, after which Bauhaus came out on top.

Later that year, on October 8, he rematched Winston Martens, taking a decision win to be crowned the WFCA Dutch Super Middleweight Champion. In early 2007, Karapetyan had a brief stint in the It's Showtime promotion. He won the It's Showtime 75MAX Trophy 2007 - Zwolle on February 2, 2007, taking decision wins over Yücel Fidan, Amir Zeyada and Tarek Slimani, respectively, before dropping a unanimous decision to Ondřej Hutník in his second and last appearance in the organization at Fights at the Border presents: It's Showtime Trophy 2007 on March 24, 2007.

Replacing Grega Smole who withdrew from the fight, Karapetyan challenged Nieky Holzken for his WFCA World Super Middleweight K-1 Championship in Eindhoven, Netherlands on February 12, 2012, losing by decision after five rounds. After rebounding with consecutive wins over Yakup Kaya and Alexandros Chatzichronoglou in the next two months, he then lost to Marc de Bonte on points on May 19, 2012.

For the second time that year, Karapetyan challenged for a world title as a late replacement when he filled in for Artem Vakhitov who conceded that he would not be able to make the -79.3 kg/175 lb weight limit in a fight for Joe Schilling's WBC Muaythai Interim World Light Heavyweight Championship at Battle for the Belts in Bangkok, Thailand on June 9, 2012. He lost by unanimous decision, losing out in every round but the third.

Turning his hand to professional boxing, he won the Ben Bril Memorial 6 Light Heavyweight (-79.3 kg/175 lb) Grand Prix in Amsterdam, Netherlands on October 15, 2012, beating Jeremy Blijd in the semi-finals and Marino Schouten in the final. He closed out the year with a controversial majority decision loss to Alexander Stetsurenko at Fight Nights: Battle of Moscow 9 in Moscow, Russia on December 16, 2012. The match, fought at -80 kg/176 lb, saw Karapetyan give Stetsurenko a lot of trouble, not allowing him to get inside and peppering him from the outside. Stetsurenko looked to have hurt Karapetyan a few times when he was able to get inside, and ultimately got a razor thin decision victory.

Glory (2013–present)
Signing with Glory in 2013 as a competitor in the organization's -77.1 kg/170 lb welterweight division, Karapetyan made his promotional debut against Roberto Cocco at Glory 7: Milan in Milan, Italy on April 20, 2013 and winning by unanimous decision. He rematched Alexander Stetsurenko on the Glory 10: Los Angeles undercard in Ontario, California, United States on September 28, 2013 and avenged his earlier defeat to the Russian with a unanimous decision victory.

In his return to boxing on October 14, 2013, he was unable to retain the title that he won a year previously as he was eliminated by Joos Poulino in the semi-finals of the seventh edition of the Ben Bril Memorial tournament.

Karapetyan competed in the four-man Glory 13: Tokyo - Welterweight World Championship Tournament in Tokyo, Japan on December 21, 2013. He was originally set to face Joseph Valtellini in the semi-finals but his opponent was later changed to Nieky Holzken when the matchups were reshuffled. Karapetyan was knocked down in rounds one and two and lost by unanimous decision.

He defeated Artur Kyshenko by unanimous decision on the Glory 14: Zagreb undercard in Zagreb, Croatia on March 8, 2014. Replacing Nieky Holzken who withdrew from the match due to a recurring shoulder injury, Karapetyan challenged Marc de Bonte for the inaugural Glory Welterweight Championship at Glory 16: Denver in Broomfield, Colorado, United States on May 3, 2014, losing by split decision.

Karapetyan was scheduled to face Hicham El Gaoui for the Enfusion 80kg title at Enfusion Live 25 on March 14, 2015. He lost the fight by unanimous decision.

Karapetyan was scheduled to face Yoann Kongolo at Glory 26: Amsterdam on December 4, 2015. Kongolo won the fight by unanimous decision.

Karapetyan was scheduled to face Yohan Lidon at CAPITAL FIGHTS on May 19, 2016. He lost the fight by a fourth-round knockout.

Personal life
Karapetyan graduated with a master's degree in law from Radboud University Nijmegen in 2011. He is able to speak five languages; Dutch, English, German and Russian in addition to his native Armenian.

Championships and awards

Boxing
Ben Bril Memorial
Ben Bril Memorial 6 Light Heavyweight (-79.3 kg/175 lb) Grand Prix Championship

Kickboxing
It's Showtime
It's Showtime 75MAX (-75 kg/165 lb) Trophy 2007 - Zwolle Championship
World Full Contact Association
WFCA 2006 Super Middleweight (-76.2 kg/168 lb) Tournament Runner-up
WFCA Dutch Super Middleweight (-76.2 kg/168 lb) Championship

Boxing record

|-
|-  bgcolor="#FFBBBB"
| 2013-10-14 || Loss ||align=left| Joos Poulino || Ben Bril Memorial 7, Semi Finals || Amsterdam, Netherlands || Decision (majority) || 4 || 3:00 || 2-1
|-
|-  bgcolor="#CCFFCC"
| 2012-10-15 || Win ||align=left| Marino Schouten || Ben Bril Memorial 6, Final || Amsterdam, Netherlands || Decision (split) || 4 || 3:00 || 2-0
|-
! style=background:white colspan=9 |
|-
|-  bgcolor="#CCFFCC"
| 2012-10-15 || Win ||align=left| Jeremy Blijd || Ben Bril Memorial 6, Semi Finals || Amsterdam, Netherlands || Decision (unanimous) || 4 || 3:00 || 1-0
|-
|-
| colspan=9 | Legend:

Kickboxing record

|-
|-  bgcolor="FFBBBB"
| 2016-05-19 || Loss ||align=left| Yohan Lidon || CAPITAL FIGHTS ||  ||  KO (Highkick) || 4 ||  || 43-13-2
|-
|-  bgcolor="FFBBBB"
| 2015-12-04 || Loss ||align=left| Yoann Kongolo || Glory 26: Amsterdam || Amsterdam, Netherlands || Decision (Unanimous) || 3 || 3:00 || 43-12-2
|-
|-  bgcolor="FFBBBB"
| 2015-03-14 || Loss ||align=left| Hicham El Gaoui || Enfusion Live 25 || Turnhout, Belgium || Decision (Unanimous) || 5 || 3:00 || 43-11-2
|-
! style=background:white colspan=9 |
|-
|-  bgcolor="#FFBBBB"
| 2014-05-03 || Loss ||align=left| Marc de Bonte || Glory 16: Denver || Broomfield, Colorado, USA || Decision (split) || 5 || 3:00 || 43-10-2
|-
! style=background:white colspan=9 |
|-
|-  bgcolor="#CCFFCC"
| 2014-03-08 || Win ||align=left| Artur Kyshenko || Glory 14: Zagreb || Zagreb, Croatia || Decision (unanimous) || 3 || 3:00 || 43-9-2
|-
|-  bgcolor="#FFBBBB"
| 2013-12-21 || Loss ||align=left| Nieky Holzken || Glory 13: Tokyo - Welterweight World Championship Tournament, Semi Finals || Tokyo, Japan || Decision (unanimous) || 3 || 3:00 || 42-9-2
|-
|-  bgcolor="#CCFFCC"
| 2013-09-28 || Win ||align=left| Alexander Stetsurenko || Glory 10: Los Angeles || Ontario, California, USA || Decision (unanimous) || 3 || 3:00 || 42-8-2
|-
|-  bgcolor="#CCFFCC"
| 2013-04-20 || Win ||align=left| Roberto Cocco || Glory 7: Milan || Milan, Italy || Decision (unanimous) || 3 || 3:00 || 41-8-2
|-
|-  bgcolor="#FFBBBB"
| 2012-12-16 || Loss ||align=left| Alexander Stetsurenko || Fight Nights: Battle of Moscow 9 || Moscow, Russia || Decision (majority) || 3 || 3:00 || 40-8-2
|-
|-  bgcolor="#FFBBBB"
| 2012-06-09 || Loss ||align=left| Joe Schilling || Battle for the Belts || Bangkok, Thailand || Decision (unanimous) || 5 || 3:00 || 40-7-2
|-
! style=background:white colspan=9 |
|-
|-  bgcolor="#FFBBBB"
| 2012-05-19 || Loss ||align=left| Marc de Bonte || || || Decision || 3 || 3:00 || 39-7-2
|-
|-  bgcolor="#CCFFCC"
| 2012-04-01 || Win ||align=left| Alexandros Chatzichronoglou || Gladiator's Night 6 || Chalcis, Greece || KO (left flying knee) || 2 || 2:00 || 39-6-2
|-
|-  bgcolor="#CCFFCC"
| 2012-03-10 || Win ||align=left| Yakup Kaya || MaxPain || Genk, Belgium || Decision || 3 || 3:00 || 38-6-2
|-
|-  bgcolor="#FFBBBB"
| 2012-02-12 || Loss ||align=left| Nieky Holzken || Natural Powers || Eindhoven, Netherlands || Decision || 5 || 3:00 || 37-6-2
|-
! style=background:white colspan=9 |
|-
|-  bgcolor="#CCFFCC"
| 2007-10-20 || Win ||align=left| Ali Cenik || StarMuay Fight Night Maastricht || Maastricht, Netherlands || Decision || 3 || 3:00 || 
|-
|-  bgcolor="#FFBBBB"
| 2007-03-24 || Loss ||align=left| Ondřej Hutník || Fights at the Border presents: It's Showtime Trophy 2007 || Lommel, Belgium || Decision (unanimous) || 3 || 3:00 || 
|-
|-  bgcolor="#CCFFCC"
| 2007-02-02 || Win ||align=left| Tarek Slimani || It's Showtime 75MAX Trophy 2007 - Zwolle, Final || Zwolle, Netherlands || Decision || 3 || 3:00 || 
|-
! style=background:white colspan=9 |
|-
|-  bgcolor="#CCFFCC"
| 2007-02-02 || Win ||align=left| Amir Zeyada || It's Showtime 75MAX Trophy 2007 - Zwolle, Semi Finals || Zwolle, Netherlands || Decision || 3 || 3:00 || 
|-
|-  bgcolor="#CCFFCC"
| 2007-02-02 || Win ||align=left| Yücel Fidan || It's Showtime 75MAX Trophy 2007 - Zwolle, Quarter Finals || Zwolle, Netherlands || Decision || 3 || 3:00 || 
|-
|-  bgcolor="#CCFFCC"
| 2006-10-08 || Win ||align=left| Winston Martens || Battle of Arnhem V || Arnhem, Netherlands || Decision || 5 || 3:00 || 
|-
! style=background:white colspan=9 |
|-
|-  bgcolor="#FFBBBB"
| 2006-06-04 || Loss ||align=left| Joost Bauhaus || WFCA Kickbox Gala Druten, Final || Druten, Netherlands || Extension round decision || 4 || 3:00 || 
|-
! style=background:white colspan=9 |
|-
|-  bgcolor="#CCFFCC"
| 2006-06-04 || Win ||align=left| Winston Martens || WFCA Kickbox Gala Druten, Semi Finals || Druten, Netherlands || Decision || 3 || 3:00 || 
|-
|-  bgcolor="#CCFFCC"
| 2006-06-04 || Win ||align=left| Mustafa Yılmaz || WFCA Kickbox Gala Druten, Quarter Finals || Druten, Netherlands || Decision || 3 || 3:00 || 
|-
|-  bgcolor="#c5d2ea"
| 2005-11-13 || Draw ||align=left| Joost Bauhaus || Time for Action || Nijmegen, Netherlands || Draw || 5 || 3:00 || 
|-
|-  bgcolor="#CCFFCC"
| 2005-06-04 || Win ||align=left| Andre Gutsch || Enter the Dragon || Arnhem, Netherlands || Decision || 3 || 3:00 || 
|-
|-  bgcolor="#CCFFCC"
| 2005-04-16 || Win ||align=left| Moncef Bennour || MMA, Karate and Muay Thai Gala || Emmen, Netherlands || Decision || 5 || 3:00 || 
|-
|-  bgcolor="#FFBBBB"
| 2004-01-25 || Loss ||align=left| Joost Bauhaus || || Nijmegen, Netherlands || Decision || || || 
|-
|-  bgcolor="#FFBBBB"
| 2003-11-12 || Loss ||align=left| Sem Braan || Veni, Vidi, Vici II || Veenendaal, Netherlands || Decision (unanimous) || 5 || 2:00 || 
|-
|-  bgcolor="#CCFFCC"
| 2003-00-00 || Win ||align=left| Henry Akdeniz || || Netherlands || KO || || || 
|-
|-
| colspan=9 | Legend:

References

External links
 Official Glory profile
 

1982 births
Living people
Armenian male boxers
Dutch male boxers
Light-heavyweight boxers
Armenian male kickboxers
Dutch male kickboxers
Middleweight kickboxers
Light heavyweight kickboxers
Armenian Muay Thai practitioners
Dutch Muay Thai practitioners
Sportspeople from Nijmegen
Dutch people of Armenian descent
Armenian emigrants to the Netherlands
Radboud University Nijmegen alumni
Glory kickboxers